Dinsmore is an unincorporated community in California. Dinsmore Airport and the Dinsmore Store are located nearby. Also nearby is the Mad River, Ruth, California and Ruth Reservoir (located in Trinity County).

Climate
This region experiences warm (but not hot) and dry summers, with no average monthly temperatures above 71.6 °F.  According to the Köppen Climate Classification system, Dinsmore has a warm-summer Mediterranean climate, abbreviated "Csb" on climate maps.

References

Unincorporated communities in Humboldt County, California
Unincorporated communities in California